Harold Hopwood Phillips (1928 — 1999) was a Ghanaian academic and doctor. He was chairman of the Ghana Medical Association and also Dean of the University of Ghana Medical School . Phillips also served as the chairman of the University of Cape Coast Council. He was the first head of the Department of Physiology of the school.

Professional life
Phillips was recruited from Canada to help establish and lead the Physiology department of the fledgling University of Ghana Medical School in Accra. He went on to become the third Dean of the medical school.

He was also chairman of the Ghana Medical Association between 1986 and 1990.

He was also made chairman of the University of Cape Coast in the late 1990s.

Personal life
Phillips was born at Cape Coast and died in London in 1999. His father was William Reginald Phillips and his mother Beatrice Phillips (ter Meulen). He had four sons with his wife Gladys. One of his brothers was J. V. L. Phillips who was the chairman of Volta Aluminium Company.

References

1928 births
1999 deaths
Fante people
Academic staff of the University of Ghana
Academic staff of the University of Ghana Medical School